Bernard Trevisan  (Bernard of Treviso, Bernardus Trevisanus) was a fictional Italian alchemist who lived from 1406-1490. His biography has been composed by editors and commentators of alchemical texts from the 16th century. It is said that he was born into a noble family in Padua and spent his entire life spending his family fortune in search of the Philosopher's stone. The mythical character emerged by a confusion with the alchemist called Bernard of Trier. A recent study founded a chronicle of his death in 1387. He has been identified with Eberhard I von der Mark (1305-1387), a law graduate and clergyman, who became chorbishop of Cologne. He resigned his positions in the Church to marry in 1346 with Maria de Looz-Agimont (ca.1336-1410), whose titles and territories counties were key points in feudal disputes involving Von der Marck family. From 1366 he was closely related to Kuno II von Falkenstein (ca.1320-1388), archbishop of Trier.

Biography
The fictional Bernard Trevisan began his career as an alchemist at the age of fourteen. He had his family's permission, as they also desired to increase their wealth. He first worked with a monk of Cîteaux named Gotfridus Leurier. They attempted for eight years to fashion the Philosopher's stone out of hen eggshells and egg yolk purified in horse manure.

He is believed to have been influential on the work of Gilles de Rais in the 1430s.

He then worked with minerals and natural salts using distillation and crystallization methods borrowed from Jabir ibn Hayyan and Muhammad ibn Zakariya al-Razi. When these failed he turned to vegetable and animal material, finally using human blood and urine. He gradually sold his wealth to buy secrets and hints towards the stone, most often from swindlers. He traveled all over the known world, including the Baltics, Germany, Spain, France, Vienna, Egypt, Palestine, Persia, Greece, Turkey, and Cyprus, to find hints left by past alchemists. His health had been deteriorating, most likely from the fumes he had created with his alchemy. He retired to the Island of Rhodes, still working on the Philosopher's stone until his death in 1490.

Attributed works
In the sixteenth century, several alchemical works were attributed to Bernard. For example, Trevisanus de Chymico miraculo, quod lapidem philosophiae appellant was edited in 1583 by Gerhard Dorn. The Answer of Bernardus Trevisanus, to the Epistle of Thomas of Bononia, and The Prefatory Epistle of Bernard Earl of Tresne, in English, appeared in the 1680 Aurifontina Chymica.

Notes

Further reading
 
 
 Kahn, Didier (2003). "Recherches sur le ‘Livre’ attribué au prétendu Bernard le Trévisan (fin du XVe siècle)", in "Alchimia e medicina nel Medioevo", Micrologus Library IX.
 Gallina, Furio (2015). "Miti e storie di alchimisti tra il medioevo e l'età contemporanea", Resana: mp/edizioni.
 José Rodríguez Guerrero, (2014-2018), “El Correctorium alchimiae (ca.1352-1362) de Ricardus Anglicus y la versión de Bernardus Magnus de Tréveris”, Azogue, 8, pp. 216–270.

External links
 Parable of the Fountain

1406 births
1490 deaths
15th-century alchemists
Italian alchemists